Kornos may refer to:

Kornos, Cyprus
Kornos, Greece